The siege of the Kållandsö Fortification took place during winter in the year of 1099 by the Swedish king Inge Stenkilsson. It was Inge's first response to the Norwegian King Magnus Barefoot who had a year or two earlier invaded Västergötaland, hoping to expand the Norwegian border down to the Götaälv. The battle itself is in its entirety described by Snorri Sturlason in his work Heimskringla.

Prelude

Magnus Barefoot, years prior to 1099, had expanded Norwegian influence around the Irish sea. It wasn't until late summer in 1099 that he finally had returned to Norway. His motives however changed and he decided to head east, with the idea of expanding the Norwegian border down to the Götaälv, Which used to be the ancient border between Norway and Västergötaland (Which was now Swedish territory). Magnus did just that, and successfully invaded Västergötaland and defeated the Swedish forces at the First Battle of Fuxerna. After the successful occupation and expansion of the Norwegian border, Magnus built a wooden fortification on the Island of Kållandsö leaving behind a force of 300 men to guard it.

When Inge Stenkilsson (Also known as Inge the Younger) heard of this, he immediately summoned the leidang (Which was about 3,000 to 3,600 men. In realistic measures however, bringing the entire leidang would be an unstable decision because it would remove the entire kingdoms defensive forces. The likely estimated number of men would thus be less. The correct number of men could therefore really be anywhere between c. 1,000 - 3,000) and set his eyes to regain the lands he just had lost.

Battle

Inge arrived at Kållandsö during the winter and the waters around the island had completely frozen, giving him the ability to walk across the ice. Before actually storming the fort, Inge offered the entire Norwegian force multiple times to live and even to keep their loot they had previously gained during the invasion if they abandoned the fortification. The Norwegians however refused the offer at all times and didn't leave the fort. Thus when the Norwegians for the last time refused the offer, Inge ordered the storming to begin. Both the attackers and defenders immediately began shooting ranged fire at each other. While this was happening, the rest of the Swedish force could actually not reach the initial wall of the fort itself as a grave had been built around it. So Inge ordered them to fill it with stone and logs. Once this was done, the Swedes gathered large wooden beams with anchors attached at the end of them. Using these beams, the Swedes climbed up on them and into the fort. Some of them even managed to tear down sections of the wall. Once inside the fort, they began to set it on fire. Realizing that the fort was sooner or later completely burning to the ground, the Norwegians surrendered.

King Inge managed to capture the rest of the Norwegian force. However, despite that the Norwegians refused the chance of surrender prior to the siege, King Inge still released the captured Norwegians after being beaten by sticks and stripped of their loot. The prisoners then made their way back to Norway.

Aftermath

The loss of the fortification and previously conquered land was told to King Magnus Barefoot by Sigurd, who had been one of the leaders of the garrison and released by King Inge Stenkilsson after the Siege. Magnus was enraged and decided to take revenge, he thus once again invaded Västergötaland. The second invasion concluded with Inge successfully ambushing Magnus at the Second battle of Fuxerna.

Sieges of the Middle Ages
Kållandsö